Brekken or Brekkebygd is a mountain village in Røros municipality in Trøndelag county, Norway.

The village has a school, shop, gas station, post office, bank, sports fields, and Brekken Church. The small Brekken airport opened in August 2009.  The mountains around Brekken are easily accessible and offer various hiking opportunities in summer and winter.  With all the nearby lakes and rivers, the area abounds in good fishing.  The area contains several sites of interest to botanists, geologists and ornithologists.  The village was settled in the mid-1600s when the mining industry began in the Røros area.

The village was the administrative centre of the municipality of Brekken from 1926 until its dissolution in 1964.

References

Røros
Villages in Trøndelag